Raine is a name derived from any of several personal names (such as Raymond or Lorraine), and may refer to:

Given name
 Raine Baljak (born 1996), Filipino-Australian beauty queen titleholder
 Raine Karp (born 1939), Estonian architect
 Raine Loo (1945–2020), Estonian actress
 Raine Maida (born 1970), Canadian musician and vocalist
 Raine Nuutinen (1931–2012), Finnish basketball player
 Raine Peltokoski, Finnish sport shooter
 Raine Seville (born 1986), Jamaican dancehall and reggae artist
 Raine Spencer, Countess Spencer (born 1929), step-mother of Lady Diana, Princess of Wales
 Raine Storey (born 1995), Canadian artist
 Raine Tuononen (born 1970), Finnish ice hockey player

Surname
 Adrian Raine (born 1954), British-American psychologist
 Craig Raine (born 1944), English poet
 David Raine (born 1957), English footballer
 James Raine (1791–1858), English historian
 James Raine (footballer) (1886–1928), English footballer
 Jessica Raine (born 1982), English actress
 Kathleen Raine (1908–2003), English poet
 Lena Raine, an American composer.
 Nancy Greene Raine (born 1943), Canadian skier
 Randy Raine-Reusch (born 1952), Canadian musician
 Richard Raine (1923–2006), pseudonym of British novelist Raymond Harold Sawkins
 Tom Raine, co-founder of the Australian real-estate franchise Raine and Horne
 William MacLeod Raine (1871–1954), British-born American novelist

Fictional characters
 Nicholas Raine, from the game  Rage
 Aldo Raine, from the 2009 war film Inglorious Basterds
 Raine Whispers, from the animated fantasy series The Owl House

See also
 Rain (disambiguation)
 Raines (surname)
 Rainey, a surname
 Raein, an Italian screamo band
 RAINN, Rape, Abuse and Incest National Network
 Rane (disambiguation)
 Rein (disambiguation)
 Reine, Norway
 Reign (disambiguation)
 Rayne (disambiguation)

Estonian feminine given names
Finnish masculine given names